Island Heat: Stranded is a 2006 Lifetime thriller film. The film was directed by Kern Konwiser and produced by his brother Kip Konwiser. It was released in United States on June 5, 2006 on Lifetime Television and was released on December 7, 2007 in Hungary. The film stars, Erica Durance, Brienne De Beau and Jack Hartnett.

Plot
A bride-to-be and her four bridesmaids travel to an exotic Caribbean island for a bachelorette party. After arriving at the luxurious resort, the women take a boat ride to a secluded island, where they can bask in sun and sand. The captain of the boat forgets to pick the girls up, leaving them stranded on the island, forcing them to use a deserted house as a makeshift shelter. That quickly turns into a nightmare when the women begin to disappear one by one.

Cast
Erica Durance as Carina
Brienne De Beau as Regan
Jack Hartnett as Anthony
Michelle Jones as Nicole
Jessica Lauren as Lynette
Vanessa Millon as Isabel
Ashley Totin as Danielle Sanders

Production
Island Heat: Stranded was filmed in Puerto Rico.

References

External links

Island Heat: Stranded at Lifetime

2006 television films
2006 films
2006 thriller films
American thriller television films
2000s English-language films
2000s American films